Strat may refer to:
 River Strat in Cornwall, UK
 Fender Stratocaster, electric guitar made by Fender
 Strategy ("strat" is a commonly used abbreviation in online gaming)
 STRAT-X, American nuclear research project
 Strat-O-Matic, American sports board game manufacturer
 The Strat Hotel, Casino and Skypod, official name of Stratosphere Las Vegas hotel-casino

See also 
 STAT (disambiguation)